The Diocese of Manchester is a Church of England diocese in the Province of York, England. Based in the city of Manchester, the diocese covers much of the county of Greater Manchester and small areas of the counties of Lancashire and Cheshire.

History
After passage of the Bishopric of Manchester Act 1847, the Diocese of Manchester was founded on 1 September 1847, having previously been part of the Diocese of Chester.

The diocese was founded in accordance with the Third Report of the Ecclesiastical Commissioners, appointed to consider the state of the Established Church in England and Wales, printed in 1836. It recommended the formation of the Bishopric of Manchester, and the Ecclesiastical Commissioners Act 1836 (6 and 7 William IV cap. 77) was passed that year whereby the King, by Order-in-Council was empowered to carry into effect the recommendations of the commissioners. It provided that the sees of St. Asaph and Bangor should be united on the next vacancy in either, and on that occurring the Bishop of Manchester should be created.

The union of the sees never took place and the Bishopric of Manchester Act 1847 was brought forward which authorised the Ecclesiastical Commissioners to bring forward an alternative reorganisation scheme in Chambers which received royal assent and the bishopric was constituted.

The diocese on its creation in 1847 originally covered the historic hundreds of Salford, Blackburn, Leyland and Amounderness and the Parish of Leigh, which lay in the hundred of West Derby. However, with the creation of the Diocese of Blackburn in 1926, which took the three northern hundreds, Manchester was left with just the hundred of Salford and Leigh. The final boundary change to the diocese was in 1933, by annexing Wythenshawe from the Diocese of Chester.

At the same time the diocese was founded, the collegiate church in Manchester was elevated to cathedral status to become the Cathedral Church of St Mary, St Denys and St George where the bishop's throne (cathedra) is located.

Organisation

Bishops
The diocesan Bishop of Manchester, David Walker, is the ordinary of the diocese and is assisted by Mark Davies, Bishop suffragan of Middleton, and Mark Ashcroft, Bishop suffragan of Bolton. The Bishop of Middleton oversees the archdeaconries of Manchester and Rochdale, and the Bishop of Bolton the archdeaconries of Bolton and Salford. Alternative episcopal oversight (for parishes in the diocese who reject the ministry of priests who are women) is provided by the provincial episcopal visitor (PEV) the Bishop suffragan of Beverley, Glyn Webster. He is licensed as an honorary assistant bishop of the diocese in order to facilitate his work there. Besides Webster, there are four retired honorary assistant bishops licensed in the diocese:
1999–present: Frank Sargeant, former Bishop at Lambeth lives in Salford (and is also licensed in Liverpool.)
2008–present: Rupert Hoare, former area Bishop of Dudley, lives in Friezeland.
2011–present: Graham Dow, a retired Bishop of Carlisle, lives in Romiley in the neighbouring Diocese of Chester, where he is also licensed as an HAB.
2012–present: retired former Bishop of Sheffield Jack Nicholls lives in, and is also licensed in, neighbouring Derby diocese.

Archdeaconries and deaneries
The diocese is divided into four archdeaconries, each divided into a number of deaneries.

Archdeaconry of Manchester (created 1843)

Archdeaconry of Rochdale (created 1910)

Archdeaconry of Bolton (created 1982)

Archdeaconry of Salford (created 2009)

The first Archdeacon of Salford, from 2009 until 1 July 2020, was David Sharples. He was succeeded by Jean Burgess, who remains also Archdeacon of Bolton.

See also
Diocese of Salford
List of churches in Greater Manchester
Dean of Manchester
Archdeacon of Manchester
Archdeacon of Bolton
Archdeacon of Rochdale

References

Further reading
Dobb, Arthur J. (1978) Like a Mighty Tortoise: the history of the Diocese of Manchester; illustrated by Arthur J. Dobb and Derek Simpson. [Manchester] : [The author] ; Littleborough : [Distributed by] Upjohn and Bottomley (Printers)
Dobb, Arthur J. et al. (comps.; 2007) The Mighty Tortoise Marches On; or the Seven Stages of Man...chester. (The present study... began by being asked to prepare a presentation on the diocese for the annual national conference of the Central Council for the Care of Churches to be held in Manchester in 2009", preface)

External links
Official website

 
1847 establishments in England
Anglican dioceses established in the 19th century
Manchester
Religious organizations established in 1847